A deep state is a political situation in a country when an internal organ does not respond to the political leadership.

Deep state may also refer to:
 The Deep State: The Fall of the Constitution and the Rise of a Shadow Government, a book by Mike Lofgren on American politics
 Deep State, a British espionage thriller TV series

See also 
 Shadow government (disambiguation)
 Deep state in Turkey, the alleged Turkish system
 Deep state in the United States, the alleged American system